Matthew 27:2 is the second verse of the twenty-seventh chapter  of the twenty-seventh chapter of the Gospel of Matthew in the New Testament. Jesus has just seen condemned by the Jewish Sanhedrin, and in this verse is presented to Pontius Pilate.

Content
The original Koine Greek, according to Westcott and Hort, reads:
και δησαντες αυτον απηγαγον και παρεδωκαν πιλατω τω ηγεμονι

In the King James Version of the Bible it is translated as:
And when they had bound him, they led him away, and delivered him to Pontius Pilate the governor.

The modern World English Bible translates the passage as:
and they bound him, and led him away, and delivered him up to Pontius Pilate, the governor.

For a collection of other versions see BibleHub Matthew 27:2.

Analysis
This verse introduces Pontius Pilate in the Gospel of Matthew. Pilate is a historical figure attested from contemporary sources, including the histories of Josephus. While Jewish sources portray Pilate as a tyrannical ruler, Christian ones have long viewed him as a weak man doing evil despite his better judgement. The Gospel of Matthew follows the narrative of a weak, but decent, Pilate who is pressured into the crucifixion by the Jewish leaders.

Like Matthew 27:1 this verse is built upon Mark 15:1. Adding the word governor may link with Jesus' prediction at Matthew 10:18 that he would be "dragged before governors." Governor was not Pilate's true title, according to the Pilate Stone he was officially Prefect of Judea. Josephus also refers to him as governor, while Tacitus uses Procurator, the later title for the governor of the region. Pilate's headquarters was at Caesarea Maritima, but he being in Jerusalem for the mass Passover festivities is logical.

It has usually been accepted that the reason for the delivery of Jesus to the Roman governor by the Sanhedrin was that the Jewish authorities did not have the power to carry out executions under Roman rule. This reason is made explicit at John 18:31. This has been questioned by some modern historians. Beginning with Jean Juster in 1914, Hans Lietzmann in 1931, and Paul Winter in 1974 looked at the legal history of the period and found several executions carried out on orders of the Sanhedrin with no mention of Roman authorities. In early Christian tradition Stephen and James were tried and sentenced to death by the Sanhedrin. The right to execute Gentile trespassers into the Temple is also established from documents of the time. Based on these facts Lietzmann and Winter originated a theory that the Jewish trial is not historical, and that the execution of Jesus was a purely Roman matter. The idea that the Jewish authorities did not have this power was a product of the Gospel writers working after the destruction of the Temple, when Roman rule was far more rigid. Other historians, notably A. N. Sherwin-White, disagree. While there are recorded executions by the Jewish authorities, that of James was during a time of lapsed imperial control and that of Stephen perhaps by an extrajudicial mob rather than any formal proceedings. Across the Empire the power of capital punishment was limited only to high Roman authorities. Judea would be exceptional if locals had such rights.

The binding of Jesus represents that he has now been convicted, as is being presented to Pilate as a dangerous figure who must be bound. Origen's Commentary on Matthew makes much of this act of binding as a connection to the Hebrew Bible and the story of Samson.

References

27:02